ius Latium, in Roman law, was a rule of law applicable to magistrates in Latium. It was either majus Latium or minus Latium,—the majus Latium raising to the dignity of Roman citizen not only the magistrate himself, but also his wife and children; the minus Latium raising to that dignity only the magistrate himself.

See also

Ius
Ius Latii
Ius Quiritium

References
Black's Law Dictionary (Second Edition 1910) (public domain)

Latin legal terminology